The Sony Ericsson W610i phone is based on the Sony Ericsson K550 and Sony Ericsson K610i. It is a quad-band GSM phone, but it does not offer 3G (UMTS or HSDPA). The W610i has colour options similar to the Sony Ericsson W880i. This phone uses the TrackID and version 2.0 of the Walkman player.

Camera
This mobile phone has a 2.0 megapixel camera, similar to that in the Sony Ericsson K550i but without the lens cover.  As with previous Sony Ericsson models, it offers an auto-focus feature and uses a photo light instead of a flash.  For this model, the focal length of the camera's lens has been reduced from 4.8mm to 3.8mm.

Specifications
 Display: 262K TFD (176x220 pixels)
 Memory: Up to 64 MB user memory 
 Size: 102 x 46 x 14 mm
 Weight: 93 grams
 Colour: Plush Orange, Satin Black
 SAR: 1.31 W/kg (10g)
 Battery: BST-33 (950mAh)

Features
Music 
 Walkman player 2.0  
 Supports MP3, AAC, AAC+, E-AAC+, WAV and m4a  
 512 MB Memory Stick included  
 TrackID music recognition software
 Polyphonic ringtone, 72 channels
 Disc2Phone music management software  
 Stereo headphones in the box  
 FM radio with RDS     
 Bluetooth stereo streaming support (A2DP)
 Java MIDP 2.0     
Messaging 
 TFT 1.96’’ Display  
 SMS, MMS, e-mail and IM   
Connectivity 
 NetFront Internet browser  
 RSS Reader
 Bluetooth 2.0 with A2DP
 Infrared port  
 USB 2.0
Supported Networks 
GSM 850
GSM 900
GSM 1800
GSM 1900
HSCSD
EDGE

See also
List of Sony Ericsson products

External links
 Josephn.net - K550 to W610 - Changing a K550 to a W610
 Official Sony Ericsson W610i Page
 GSMArena

W610
Mobile phones introduced in 2007
Mobile phones with infrared transmitter